Walbrook is a neighborhood in West Baltimore, located along West North Avenue. Coppin State University is located in Walbrook, and the neighborhood was also the namesake of the former Walbrook High School.

Several major streets, North Avenue, Windsor Mill Road, Bloomingdale Road, and Hilton Street, meet in the Walbrook area in a location known as Walbrook Junction. This area serves as a transportation hub for the Maryland Transit Administration. It is the western terminus for Bus Route 13, and is also served by Bus Routes 15, 16, 91, and 97.

Neighborhoods in Baltimore
West Baltimore